The Public Service Pensions and Judicial Offices Act 2022 is an Act of the Parliament of the United Kingdom that raised the retirement age for British judges from seventy back to seventy-five years.

References

External links

United Kingdom Acts of Parliament 2022
Pensions in the United Kingdom
Judiciaries of the United Kingdom